Dalbergia cearensis, with common names Brazilian kingwood, kingwood, Bois de Violette, and violetwood, is a small tree endemic to Brazil.

It is native to the states of Bahia, Ceará, Paraíba, Pernambuco, and Piauí,

It is the source of kingwood, a classic furniture wood.

Vernacular names
Brazilian common names include Jacaranda-cega-macho, Jacaranda-violeta, Miolo-de-negro, and Pau-violeta.

References

cearensis
Endemic flora of Brazil
Flora of Bahia
Flora of Paraíba
Flora of Pernambuco
Environment of Ceará
Environment of Piauí
Trees of Brazil
Taxa named by Adolpho Ducke